"Twilight of the Gods" is a single by the German power metal band Blind Guardian, released in 2014. It was released as the first single from their 2015 studio album Beyond the Red Mirror.

Track listing 
 "Twilight of the Gods" – 4:51
 "Time Stands Still (at the Iron Hill)" (live in Wacken 2011) – 5:15
 "The Bard's Song (in the Forest)" (live in Wacken 2011) – 3:40

Lineup 
 Hansi Kürsch – vocals
 André Olbrich – lead and rhythm guitars
 Marcus Siepen – rhythm guitars
 Frederik Ehmke – drums

Guest musicians 
 Barend Courbois – bass (track 1)
 Matthias Ulmer – keyboards (track 1)
 The Choir Company: Billy King, Olaf Senkbeil & Thomas Hackmann (track 1)
 Michael Schüren – keyboards (tracks 2 & 3)
 Oliver Holzwarth – bass (tracks 2 & 3)

Personnel 
 Charlie Bauerfeind – recording, mixing and producing (track 1), mastering
 Blind Guardian – producing (track 1)
 Peter Brandt – recording (tracks 2 & 3)
 Tomi Geiger – mixing (tracks 2 & 3)
 Wolfgang Eller – mastering
 Felipe Machado Franco – artwork and booklet design

References 

2014 songs
2014 singles
Blind Guardian songs
Nuclear Blast Records singles
Songs written by Hansi Kürsch
Songs written by André Olbrich